Arhopala delta is a species of butterfly belonging to the lycaenid family described by William Harry Evans in 1957. It is found in Southeast Asia (Peninsular Malaya, Sumatra and Borneo).

References

Arhopala
Butterflies described in 1957
Butterflies of Asia
Taxa named by William Harry Evans